This is a list of 1. FC Union Berlin seasons in German football, from their first competitive season after German reunification in 1990. It details the club's achievements in major competitions, and the top scorers for each season.

Recent seasons (from 1991 onwards)

External links 
 1. FC Union Berlin on fussballdaten.de (German)
  (German)
 immerunioner.de (German)

Seasons
Union Berlin
German football club statistics